This is a list of episodes for the US television program The Courtship of Eddie's Father.

Series overview
<onlyinclude>

Episodes

Season 1 (1969–70)

Season 2 (1970–71)

Season 3 (1971–72)

References

External links
 

Courtship of Eddie's Father